Elliott Avent (born May 1, 1956) is a baseball coach, who is the current head baseball coach of the NC State Wolfpack. He attended North Carolina State University, but he did not play for the baseball program. In his 25th season of coaching the Wolfpack, Avent has compiled both the most wins and most losses of any head baseball coach in NC State history.

Early life
Avent attended North Carolina State University, and had intentions of playing college baseball for the Wolfpack, but when he saw the way coach Sammy Esposito treated other players Avent considered better than him, he decided to not try out for the team.

Avent left NC State when he was only about 20 credits away from a degree in textiles in order to focus on a career as a baseball coach. He started by accepting an assistant coaching job at North Carolina Wesleyan University. He would later finish a degree at Virginia Commonwealth University.

In 1993, Avent managed the Brewster Whitecaps, a collegiate summer baseball team in the prestigious Cape Cod Baseball League.

Head coaching record

See also
List of current NCAA Division I baseball coaches

References

1956 births
Cape Cod Baseball League coaches
Living people
Louisburg Hurricanes baseball coaches
NC State Wolfpack baseball coaches
New Mexico State Aggies baseball coaches
North Carolina Wesleyan Battling Bishops baseball coaches
VCU Rams baseball coaches
William & Mary Tribe baseball coaches
Virginia Commonwealth University alumni